Magnolia cararensis is a species of flowering plant in the family Magnoliaceae. It is endemic to Colombia, where it is known from a single location. This area is vulnerable to clearing for agriculture and the trees are cut for wood.

References

cararensis
Endemic flora of Colombia
Taxonomy articles created by Polbot